The Communauté urbaine Creusot Montceau is the communauté urbaine, an intercommunal structure, centred on the cities of Le Creusot and Montceau-les-Mines. It is located in the Saône-et-Loire department, in the Bourgogne-Franche-Comté region, eastern France. It was created in 1970. Its area is 742.0 km2. Its population was 93,072 in 2018, of which 21,491 in Le Creusot and 17,897 in Montceau-les-Mines.

Member communes
The Communauté urbaine Creusot Montceau consists of the following 34 communes:

Blanzy
Charmoy
Ciry-le-Noble
Écuisses
Essertenne
Génelard
Gourdon
Le Breuil
Le Creusot
Les Bizots
Marigny
Marmagne
Mary
Montceau-les-Mines
Montcenis
Montchanin
Mont-Saint-Vincent
Morey
Perrecy-les-Forges
Perreuil
Pouilloux
Saint-Berain-sous-Sanvignes
Saint-Eusèbe
Saint-Firmin
Saint-Julien-sur-Dheune
Saint-Laurent-d'Andenay
Saint-Micaud
Saint-Pierre-de-Varennes
Saint-Romain-sous-Gourdon
Saint-Sernin-du-Bois
Saint-Symphorien-de-Marmagne
Saint-Vallier
Sanvignes-les-Mines
Torcy

References

External links
 Urban Community of Creusot-Montceau

Creusot-Montceau
Creusot-Montceau